William I of Bimbia, born Bile, was the chief and king of the Isubu ethnic group, who lived in Bimbia on the coast of Cameroon in the mid-to-late 19th century. British traders recognised the sovereignty of William's Bimbia and titled him "king". William sold land to the British missionary Alfred Saker to found the Baptist colony of Victoria, now Limbe. This puzzled rival Bakweri chiefs, since William did not actually own the territory.

William was succeeded by Young King William, his son.

Notes and references

External links
 

Cameroonian traditional rulers
19th-century monarchs in Africa